Vasilios Tsevas (born 27 May 1995) is a Greek footballer who plays for Marko as a forward.

Club career
Tsevas promoted to AEK Athens senior squad in 2013. He played 17 times scoring 4 goals in the semi-pro Football League 2.
He made his professional debut on December 21, 2014 against Iraklis Psachna for the 2014-1015 Football League matchday 10.

In January 2020, Tsevas joined Marko (Γ.Σ Μαρκο in Greece).

International career
Tsevas was a member of Greece U-19 since 2013.

Honours
AEK Athens
Football League 2: 1
 2014 (6th Group)

References

External links
 Scoresway.com Profile
 http://www.aekfc.gr/pld/vasilis-tsevas-43662.htm?lang=el&path=-262564131

1995 births
Living people
AEK Athens F.C. players
Iraklis Psachna F.C. players
Pierikos F.C. players
Panachaiki F.C. players
Acharnaikos F.C. players
Anagennisi Karditsa F.C. players
Kallithea F.C. players
Association football forwards
Footballers from Athens
Greek footballers